is one of the five wards of Kumamoto City, Japan. Meaning literally "north ward," it is bordered by the Nishi-ku, Chūō-ku, Higashi-ku and also by the cities of Yamaga, Kikuchi, Kōshi and the towns of Gyokutō and Kikuyō. As of 2012, it has a population of 140,684 people and an area of 115.65 km2.

External links

Wards of Kumamoto